Prince Francis of the Two Sicilies, Count of Trapani (Full Italian name: Francesco di Paola Luigi Emanuele, Principe di Borbone delle Due Sicilie; 13 August 1827 –  24 September 1892) was a member of the House of Bourbon-Two Sicilies.

Life
Born in Naples, Francis was the youngest child and son of Francis I of the Two Sicilies and his second wife, Maria Isabella of Spain. He received the title of Count of  Trapani. He was three years old at the death of his father and the ascension of his brother Ferdinand II of the Two Sicilies to the throne. As the youngest son in a large family, he was destined to follow a career in the church and was educated at the Jesuit college in Rome. His religious career was abandoned in 1844 when King Louis Philippe of France proposed to marry Francis to the young Queen Isabella II of Spain. She was three years younger than him and was both his cousin and his niece. The French ambassador to the Holy See who met the Count of Trapani at this time described him unfavorably as " very ugly, small, of sickly appearance, without expression of intelligence; and when I remember in what condition of health I saw Queen Isabella during my stay in Spain (she suffered from an acute form of eczema), I cannot help thinking that at least from the physical point of view, they could choose better".

The Count of Trapani hesitated in putting forward his candidacy to marry Isabella II. His brother the Count of Aquila, his confessor, and the pro-Austrian party in Naples were all against the idea, thinking that he would be an instrument in King Louis Philippe's hands and that the Queen of Spain could not bear children. However, after a family council on 17 June 1845, Trapani accepted marrying his niece under pressure by his brother Ferdinand II, his mother, and the French ambassador. However, he could not ask for the Queen's hand, she had to offer it. Spain's prime minister Narvaez and Francis's sister Queen Maria Christina favored his candidacy. However, after the fall of Narvaez's government in April 1846, and facing the lack of support in Spain for the project, Maria Christina chose her nephew the Duke of Cadiz as a husband for her daughter in an agreement with King Louis Philippe.

Four years later,  on 10 April 1850, Francis married another niece, Archduchess Maria Isabella of Austria, Princess of Tuscany, daughter of Leopold II, Grand Duke of Tuscany and his wife Princess Maria Antonia of the Two Sicilies. Their union was unpopular in Tuscany as the Bourbon of Naples were disliked on political grounds.

In spite of family intrigues, he was loyal to his brother Ferdinand II. Because he did not bother Ferdinand II with petitions, Francis was well liked by the king. Like his brothers, the Count of Syracuse and the Count of Aquila, Trapani had a weakness for women of easy virtue, but he did not get involve in scandals. At Ferdinand II's death on 22 May 1859, Trapani was  entrusted with  handling the army. During the short reign of his nephew  King Francis II, Trapani, lacking in political acumen, provided him with little help in the critical time of the fall of the Kingdom of the Two Sicillies.
 
After the Kingdom of the Two Sicilies fell in 1861 during the Expedition of the Thousand, the royal family went into exile. Francis and his family went to Rome, where they were under the protection of Pope Pius IX. However, the Papal States were also invaded in 1870 by Victor Emmanuel II of Italy and Francis and his family fled next to France. Francis died in 1892 in Paris at 65 years of age.

Issue
The Count of Trapani and his wife had six children:
Princess Maria Antonietta of the Two Sicilies (16 March 1851 – 12 September 1938)
 ∞ Prince Alfonso, Count of Caserta on 8 June 1868 in Rome, had 12 children.
Prince Leopoldo of the Two Sicilies (24 September 1853 – 4 September 1870)
Princess Maria Teresa Pia of the Two Sicilies (7 January 1855 – 1 September 1856)
Princess Maria Carolina of the Two Sicilies (21 February 1856 – 7 April 1941)
 ∞ Count Andrzej Przemysław Zamoyski on 19 November 1885 in Paris, had 7 children.
Prince Ferdinando of the Two Sicilies (25 May 1857 – 22 July 1859)
Princess Maria Annunziata of the Two Sicilies (21 September 1858 – 20 March 1873)

Honours
Knight of the Order of Saint Januarius (1830)
Knight of the Spanish Order of the Golden Fleece (1830)
Knight of the Order of Charles III
Knight Grand Cross of the Order of Saint Ferdinand and of Merit
Knight of the Military Order of Maria Theresa (1861)
Knight Grand Cross of the Order of Saint Joseph
Knight Grand Cross of the Order of the Tower and Sword

Ancestry

References

1827 births
1892 deaths
19th-century Neapolitan people
Princes of Bourbon-Two Sicilies
Counts of Trapani
19th-century Roman Catholics
Italian Roman Catholics
Burials at Père Lachaise Cemetery
Knights of the Golden Fleece of Spain
Knights Cross of the Military Order of Maria Theresa
Sons of kings